José Daniel Álvarez (born 21 March 1975) is an Argentine former professional footballer who played as a midfielder.

Career
Álvarez played in Argentina and Andorra for Belgrano, Racing de Córdoba, Talleres de Perico, FC Rànger's and FC Santa Coloma.

References

1975 births
Living people
Argentine footballers
Club Atlético Belgrano footballers
Racing de Córdoba footballers
Talleres de Perico footballers
FC Rànger's players
FC Santa Coloma players
Association football midfielders
Argentine expatriate footballers
Argentine expatriate sportspeople in Andorra
Expatriate footballers in Andorra